Worst Driver is a television franchise that started in the United Kingdom. As of 2018, Canada's Worst Driver was the longest-running version in the franchise and ran continuously since 2005. In May 2019, Andrew Younghusband announced on his personal Facebook page that the show would not be renewed for a fifteenth season, with no reason being given publicly for the series' cancellation (it is believed that Proper Television president Guy O'Sullivan's death may have contributed to the decision).

Original series

Britain's Worst Driver was a British television series created and hosted by ex-Top Gear host Quentin Willson made by Mentorn and shown on Five in the United Kingdom from October 2002 to December 2003.

International versions

World's Worst Driver
World's Worst Driver follows the formula of Britain's Worst Driver, but it includes contestants from Denmark, Norway, Sweden, Thailand and New Zealand. At the end of each episode, the most improved driver wins a car.

History
On the first season of De Allerslechtste Chauffeur van Nederland in 2011, a bad driver injured host Ruben Nicolai and a cameraman during its shoulder check challenge when the driver let go of the wheel, covered his eyes and pressed the gas pedal. That was the first time a host was ever injured on any of the shows in the franchise.

Similar shows
Canada's Worst Handyman was a sister series to Canada's Worst Driver that aired from 2006 to 2011 that focused on rehabilitating the country's most inept home renovators, Don't Drive Here was a spin-off of Canada's Worst Driver that aired from 2013 to 2015 that focused on learning to drive better than a local professional driver. All three shows were hosted by Younghusband.

See also
 List of television show franchises

Footnotes

References